Chloe Logarzo (born 22 December 1994) is an Australian professional soccer player who plays as a midfielder for Kansas City Current in the National Women's Soccer League and the Australia women's national team.

Early life
Logarzo was born in Sydney, New South Wales. Her family is Italian on her father's side and Scottish on her mother's side. She started playing football aged five for Redbacks FC (formerly Carlingford Redbacks), but did not play at an elite level until some years later, having been rejected on some occasions for a lack of size.

Club career

Sydney FC, 2011–2015 
Logarzo began her career with Sydney FC during the 2011–12 W-League season, and made her debut in a 4–1 victory over Newcastle Jets on 12 November 2011. Her second, and final, appearance of the season came in a 3–0 victory over Perth Glory on 7 January 2012.

Logarzo remained with Sydney FC for the 2012–13 season. She scored her first goal for the club against Perth Glory on 17 November 2012, but was unable to prevent Sydney FC from losing 3–1. She was on the scoresheet once more in the following game, scoring twice in a 4–0 victory over Adelaide United on 24 November 2012. Logarzo played a total of twelve league games over the course of the season, scoring thrice, as Sydney FC won the W-League title for the second time.

Colorado Pride, 2014
Logarzo joined fellow Australian and Colorado Pride W-League Head Coach Daniel Clitnovici  in the 2014 USL W-League. Logarzo led Colorado Pride to a historic play off berth in their inaugural season with 8 goals and 7 assists in 10 games as well as being named the 2014 USL W-League Rookie of the year. An award handed out to the player in their 1st season playing in the W-League.

Logarzo was retained by Sydney FC for the 2013–14 season.

Newcastle Jets, 2015–2017
Logarzo joined Newcastle Jets for the 2015–16 season. She intended to return for 2016–17, refusing bigger offers from elsewhere, but arrived carrying an ankle injury sustained during her spell in Sweden with Eskilstuna United. In October 2017, it was announced that Logarzo would not be returning to Newcastle Jets.

Eskilstuna United, 2016
In June 2016, Logarzo joined Swedish Damallsvenskan side Eskilstuna United. She made her debut on 28 August 2016 playing the whole match in a 2–1 victory over Vittsjö. She scored her first goal in a 3–1 victory over Kopparbergs/Göteborg on 25 September 2016. Logarzo made 10 league appearances scoring two goals and left the club following their UEFA Women's Champions League defeat by VfL Wolfsburg.

Avaldsnes, 2017
In February 2017, Logarzo joined Norwegian Toppserien side Avaldsnes, she made 16 appearances for the club. Logarzo left the club early when she was benched for the Round of 32 Champions League game against FC Barcelona Femení.

Sydney FC, 2017–2020
In October 2017, Logarzo returned to Sydney FC. In the 2017–18 season Logarzo appeared in 11 games and scored 3 goals. She re-signed with Sydney for the 2018-19 W-League season and appeared in all 14 games for the team  Logarzo scored Sydney's fourth goal in the 2019 W-League Grand Final, helping Sydney to a 4–2 victory over Perth, this was Logarzo's second W-League Championship.

Offseason with Blacktown Spartans FC, 2018
Logarzo signed with Blacktown Spartans FC in the NPL NSW for the 2018 season.

Loan to Washington Spirit, 2019
In February 2019, the Washington Spirit announced that Logarzo would be joining the team on loan for the 2019 NWSL season. At the end of the season, Logarzo was made available on the NWSL Re-Entry Wire and her rights selected by the Orlando Pride. The transaction was later voided after the league realized Logarzo should not have been made available for selection and allowed to go through the re-entry process.

Bristol City, 2020–2021
On 23 January 2020, Logarzo signed a one-and-a-half year contract with English FA WSL club Bristol City. Logarzo scored her first FA WSL goal from the penalty spot in a 2–2 draw with Tottenham Hotspur on November 14.

Kansas City, 2021
Logarzo was transferred from Bristol City to the NWSL's Kansas City in January 2021.

Loan to Western United
In September 2022, it was announced Logarzo will be loaned to A-League Women's newest expansion club Western United for the 2022–23 A-League Women season. She joined them after the NWSL season, in time for the A-League pre-season. In February 2023, Logarzo's loan ended after serving as a vice-captain of the club and playing a major role in their success.

International career
Logarzo was the captain of the Australian under-20 side that finished runner-up at the 2013 AFF Women's Championship, drawing praise for her performance in the final. She retained her place in the squad for the AFC U-19 Women's Championship. She made her full international debut for Australia on 24 November 2013, in a 2–0 victory over China.

Logarzo was dropped from the Matildas squad for the 2015 FIFA Women's World Cup, but was included in the 2016 Rio Olympics squad. She appeared in all four of Australia's matches in Rio. Logarzo was one of Australia's penalty takers as their quarter-final match against Brazil went to penalties. She scored her penalty, but the Matildas were defeated 7–6.

Logarzo won the 2017 Tournament of Nations with Australia, where they defeated the United States for the first time. She participated at her first Asian Cup in 2018, where she appeared in all 5 matches, having scored a goal in the group stage match against Vietnam.

Logarzo scored against Brazil at the 2019 FIFA Women's World Cup.

Logarzo was selected for the 2020 Tokyo Olympics squad. The Matildas advanced to the quarter-finals with a victory and a draw in the group stage. In the quarter-finals, they defeated Great Britain 4-3 after extra time. However, they lost 1–0 to Sweden in the semi-finals and 4–3 to the US in the bronze medal match, going home empty-handed. Full details.

Career statistics

Club

International goals
 As of match played 11 March 2020 Australia score listed first, score column indicates score after each Logarzo goal.

Honours

Club
Sydney FC
 W-League Championship: 2012–13
 W-League Championship: 2018–19

International
 AFC Olympic Qualifying Tournament: 2016
 Tournament of Nations: 2017

Individual
 W-League Rookie of the Year: 2014

Personal life
Logarzo is openly lesbian. She has spoken publicly about her sexuality. On coming out in the media Logarzo said, "There are still a few people scared that it is going to tarnish their image but for me, if it was going to tarnish my image then it's not the image I want because I'm not telling the truth."

On a February 5, 2020 podcast Logarzo discusses her coming out story, playing overseas, and her relationship with American soccer player, McKenzie Berryhill, former teammate on Washington Spirit. Berryhill joined Logarzo in the UK during quarantine.

Logarzo discusses the meaning behind her 13 tattoos in a video on her official YouTube channel.

She trained as an apprentice landscaper before pursuing football full-time.

Logarzo is an occasional panellist on Paramount+ and Network 10's football coverage in Australia.

See also
 Women's association football in Australia

References

External links 
 
 
 
 

Australian women's soccer players
Footballers at the 2016 Summer Olympics
1994 births
Living people
Sydney FC (A-League Women) players
Newcastle Jets FC (A-League Women) players
Eskilstuna United DFF players
Avaldsnes IL players
A-League Women players
Damallsvenskan players
Expatriate women's footballers in Sweden
Women's association football midfielders
Australian people of Italian descent
Australian people of Scottish descent
Association footballers' wives and girlfriends
Olympic soccer players of Australia
Australia women's international soccer players
Lesbian sportswomen
Australian LGBT sportspeople
Australian LGBT soccer players
2019 FIFA Women's World Cup players
Washington Spirit players
National Women's Soccer League players
Bristol City W.F.C. players
Women's Super League players
Australian expatriate sportspeople in England
Kansas City Current players
Western United FC (A-League Women) players
Footballers at the 2020 Summer Olympics
21st-century LGBT people
Sportswomen from New South Wales
Australian expatriate women's soccer players
Expatriate women's footballers in England
Australian expatriate sportspeople in Norway
Expatriate women's footballers in Norway
Expatriate women's soccer players in the United States
Australian expatriate sportspeople in the United States
Australian expatriate sportspeople in Sweden
Soccer players from Sydney